Tasmanida norfolkae is a species of squat lobster in a monotypic genus in the family Munididae.

References

External links

Squat lobsters
Monotypic arthropod genera
Taxa named by Shane T. Ahyong
Crustaceans described in 2007